Arnold Stephen Jacobs Jr., commonly called A.J. Jacobs (born March 20, 1968) is an American journalist, author, and lecturer best known for writing about his lifestyle experiments. He is an editor at large for Esquire and has worked for the Antioch Daily Ledger and Entertainment Weekly.

Early life
Jacobs was born in New York City to secular Jewish parents Arnold Jacobs Sr., a lawyer, and Ellen Kheel. He has one sister, Beryl Jacobs. He was educated at The Dalton School and Brown University.

Career
Jacobs has said that he sees his life as a series of experiments in which he immerses himself in a project or lifestyle, for better or worse, then writes about what he learned. The genre is often called immersion journalism or "stunt journalism".

In one of these experiments ("stunts") Jacobs read all 32 volumes of the Encyclopædia Britannica, which he wrote about in his book, The Know-It-All: One Man's Humble Quest to Become the Smartest Person in the World (2004). In the book, he also chronicles his personal life along with various endeavors like joining Mensa. The book spent eight weeks on The New York Times Best Seller list. NPR's Weekend Edition ran a series of segments featuring the unusual facts Jacobs learned in each letter. Jacobs also wrote a column for mental floss magazine describing the highlights of each volume. The book received positive reviews in The New York Times, Time magazine  and USA Today. However, Joe Queenan panned it in the New York Times Book Review. Queenan called the book "corny, juvenile, smug, tired" and "interminable" and characterized Jacobs as "a prime example of that curiously modern innovation: the pedigreed simpleton." Four months later, Jacobs responded in an essay entitled “I Am Not a Jackass”.

In 2005 Jacobs out-sourced his life to India such that personal assistants would do everything for him from answering his e-mails, reading his children good-night stories, and arguing with his wife. Jacobs wrote about it in an Esquire article called "My Outsourced Life" (2005). The article was excerpted in The 4-Hour Workweek by Timothy Ferriss.  Jacobs also talked about his outsourcing experiences on a Moth storytelling podcast.

In another experiment Jacobs wrote an article for Esquire called "I Think You're Fat" (2007), about the experiment he conducted with Radical Honesty, a lifestyle of total truth-telling promoted by Virginia therapist Brad Blanton, whom Jacobs interviewed for the article.

Jacobs' book The Year of Living Biblically: One Man's Humble Quest to Follow the Bible as Literally as Possible (2007) chronicles his experiment to live for one year according to all the moral codes expressed in the Bible, including stoning adulterers, blowing a shofar at the beginning of every month, and refraining from trimming the corners of his facial hair (which he followed by not trimming his facial hair at all). The book spent 11 weeks on the New York Times bestseller list, and Jacobs gave a TED talk about what he learned during the project. In May 2017, CBS Television picked up a TV series based on the book. It was originally renamed By the Book for television, but later changed to Living Biblically.

The Guinea Pig Diaries: My Life as an Experiment (2009) is a series of first person essays about his experiences with various guides for human behavior, including thanking everyone for the morning cup of coffee.

Jacobs is the author of The Two Kings: Elvis and Jesus  (1994), an irreverent comedic comparison of Elvis Presley and Jesus; and America Off-Line (1996). He also writes for mental floss, a trivia magazine.

In his book Drop Dead Healthy: One Man's Humble Quest for Bodily Perfection (2012), he explores different ways humans can bring their bodies to peak health, from diet to exercise. He wrote the book while walking on a treadmill. Jacobs gave a related TED talk about this health quest entitled "How Healthy Living Nearly Killed Me".

From 2011 to 2012, Jacobs wrote the "Extreme Health" column for Esquire magazine, covering such topics as high-intensity interval training and the quantified self. Since 2012, he has written the "Modern Problems" advice column for mental floss magazine. The column compares modern day life to the horrors of the past.

As of May 2013, Jacobs writes a weekly advice column for Esquire.com called "My Huddled Masses".  The column is crowdsourced to Jacobs's 100,000 Facebook followers, who give etiquette and love advice. He also writes the regular feature "Obituaries" for Esquire, which consists of satirical death notices for cultural trends, such as American hegemony.

As of 2015 Jacobs was working on a project called the Global Family Reunion, where he aims to connect as many people as possible to the global family tree at Geni.com and WikiTree. He hosted the Global Family Reunion, planned to be largest family reunion in history on June 6, 2015, at the New York Hall of Science.

On December 5, 2016, Gimlet Media announced Jacobs as the host of Twice Removed, a podcast focused on genealogy. In June 2016, Gimlet announced that the podcast would not be renewed for a second season.

In 2020, he is working on a book which reframes global issues as puzzles.

In September, 2022, the New York Times published a story by Jacobs detailing a 1988 kayaking excursion in which he and his sister were lost overnight in the waterways of Glacier Bay National Park. They were eventually saved by an unknown group of campers on Kidney Island and a search seaplane rented by their father.

Personal life
Jacobs is married to Julie Schoenberg and has three sons: Jasper Kheel-Lime Jacobs (born March 11, 2004) and twins Zane and Lucas Jacobs (born August 24, 2006).

Jacobs is a first cousin, once removed, of the legal scholar Cass Sunstein.

Jacobs is a member of Giving What We Can and pledges 10% of lifelong earnings to charity. He donates to the Against Malaria Foundation and other effective altruism organizations.

Bibliography

Books

1996. America Off-Line: The Complete Outernet Starter Kit 
2003. Esquire Presents: What It Feels Like 
2005. The Know-It-All: One Man’s Humble Quest to Become the Smartest Person in the World 
2007. The Year of Living Biblically: One Man’s Humble Quest to Follow the Bible as Literally as Possible (2007) 
2010. The Guinea Pig Diaries: My Life as an Experiment 
2012. Drop Dead Healthy: One Man’s Humble Quest for Bodily Perfection 
2017. It's All Relative: Adventures Up and Down the World's Family Tree 
2018. Thanks A Thousand: A Gratitude Journey 
2022. The Puzzler: One Man’s Quest to Solve the Most Baffling Puzzles Ever, from Crosswords to Jigsaws to the Meaning of Life

Essays and reporting
2005. "My Outsourced Life", Esquire 
2007. "I Think You're Fat", Esquire
2008. "My Life as a Hot Woman"', Esquire 
2009. "The 9:10 to Crazyland", Esquire 
2012. "How to Blurb and Blurb and Blurb", The New York Times 
2012. "Overly Documented Life", Esquire 

2013. "Grading the MOOC University", The New York Times

References

External links

 
 
 My Year of Living Biblically (TED Talk) 
 The Importance of Self-Delusion in the Creative Process Talk
 How Healthy Living Nearly Killed Me (TED Talk)
 A.J. Jacobs on The Colbert Report (2009)
 A.J. Jacobs on The Dr. Oz Show  (2012)
 American Society of Journalists and Authors 2013 Keynote Address by A.J. Jacobs
 A.J. Jacobs on NPR: Ask Me Another (2013)
 A.J. Jacobs on the 80,000 Hours podcast (2020)
 A.J Jacobs on his year-long attempt to become a know-it-all on The Filter (2020)

1968 births
Living people
American atheists
American humorists
American male journalists
American magazine editors
American memoirists
Brown University alumni
Esquire (magazine) people
Jewish American writers
Writers from New York City
Journalists from New York City
Mensans